Paramontana is a small genus of sea snails, marine gastropod mollusks in the family Raphitomidae.

This genus was originally defined solely by the non-planctotrophic protoconch morphology of its species. It should be considered as a synonym of either Kermia or Pseudodaphnella

Species
Species within the genus Paramontana include:
 Paramontana blanfordi (G. Nevill & H. Nevill, 1875)
 Paramontana exilis (Pease, 1860)
 Paramontana fusca Laseron, 1954
 Paramontana mayana (Hedley, 1922)
 Paramontana modesta (Angas, 1877)
 Paramontana punicea (Hedley, 1922)
 Paramontana rufozonata (Angas, 1877)
Species brought into synonymy
 Paramontana oligoina (Hedley, 1922) : synonym of Pseudodaphnella oligoina Hedley, 1922

References

 Laseron, C. 1954. Revision of the New South Wales Turridae (Mollusca). Australian Zoological Handbook. Sydney : Royal Zoological Society of New South Wales pp. 56, pls 1–12.
 Powell, A.W.B. 1966. The molluscan families Speightiidae and Turridae, an evaluation of the valid taxa, both Recent and fossil, with list of characteristic species. Bulletin of the Auckland Institute and Museum. Auckland, New Zealand 5: 1–184, pls 1–23

External links
 Bouchet, P.; Kantor, Y. I.; Sysoev, A.; Puillandre, N. (2011). A new operational classification of the Conoidea (Gastropoda). Journal of Molluscan Studies. 77(3): 273-308
 
 Worldwide Mollusc Species Data Base: Raphitomidae
 Grove, S.J. (2018). A Guide to the Seashells and other Marine Molluscs of Tasmania